First Chinese Baptist Church of Fountain Valley or FCBC-FV is an evangelical Christian Church located in Fountain Valley, California.

History
FCBC-FVs first public service was held on February 20, 1977, with sixty-six people in attendance. In April 1981, the church acquired a new property on Hazard Ave. in Fountain Valley. The "Church Dedication service" was held on July 22, 1981.

In July 1994, construction began on the property of Fountain Valley, Construction finished, and the church began the first worship service held in the new property on November 21, 1994. 

On January 1, 1995, "First Chinese Baptist Church of Fountain Valley" was incorporated as FCBCFV, with a "Church Dedication service" held twenty-one days later.

References

External links
 
 Sermon archive 

Baptist churches in California
Chinese-American culture in California
Churches in Orange County, California
Christian organizations established in 1977
1977 establishments in California
Chinese-American churches